Pir Eshaq (also Romanized as Pīr Esḩaq, Pīr Esḩāq, and Pīr Esḩáq) is a village in Harzandat-e Gharbi Rural District, in the Central District of Marand County, East Azerbaijan Province, Iran. At the 2006 census, its population was 20, in 5 families.

References 

Populated places in Marand County